Paide tehisjärv is a lake next to the town of Paide, in the center of Estonia.

See also
List of lakes of Estonia

Lakes of Estonia
Paide
Landforms of Järva County